Hapugaha-Arawa is a village in Sri Lanka. It is located within Central Province.

        

Country: Sri Lanka

City: Hapugaha-Arawa

Latitude and Longitude of Hapugaha-Arawa

Latitude: 7.21667

Longitude: 80.7667

See also
List of towns in Central Province, Sri Lanka

References

External links

Populated places in Nuwara Eliya District